"You Are the Reason" is a song by English singer Calum Scott. It was released on 17 November 2017 via Capitol Records, as his second original single from his debut album Only Human. It was produced by Fraser T. Smith. The song has been streamed over one billion times, and has sold over five million copies worldwide. The music video was filmed entirely in Kyiv, Ukraine and recently has reached 800 million views. A duet version with Leona Lewis charted internationally, and achieved over 100 million streams on Spotify, with its music video surpassing over 400 million views on YouTube.

Composition
According to sheet music published at Sheetmusicdirect.com, "You Are the Reason" is a moderately slow tempo of 58 beats per minute. Calum Scott's vocal range spans from C3 to B4 during the song.

Music video
The official music video for the song was released on Calum Scott's YouTube channel on January 5, 2018. It has since gained over 861 million views and 6.1 million likes.

The video shows Calum singing the song as he walks on Khreschatyk Street, seeing couples and best friends walk by, making him feel lonely. The video then cuts to a scene in a house featuring a husband and a pregnant wife, then returns to Calum singing. He watches a family walking towards a car, but having the father separated from the mother and daughter. Calum leaves the scene and walks around Saint Sophia Cathedral as the camera shows a spotlight being aimed at a building, which then shows a man inside the building talking to his anxious significant other.

The video briefly returns to Calum singing then shows a family, consisting of a husband, wife, and two adolescent children in a bedroom with the wife's sick elderly mother and the children's grandmother, depicting her last moments. The video returns to Calum fixing the collar of his coat, then cuts back to the scene of the sick grandmother, showing her passing as the wife cries. As Calum walks under a bridge, the camera cuts to a couple riding a taxi, with the woman giving the man an earphone to listen music to. The camera then cuts to Calum watching a couple dance in a spotlight. The scene briefly shifts to a clip taken from over the park, then returns to the couple dancing. Calum is later seen walking towards a man smiling with the spotlight following a girl running behind Calum. The two reunite and kiss as Calum walks beside them. Calum ends the song while looking at the camera and the video ends as he walks away.

Leona Lewis duet and other versions

Leona Lewis duet

On 9 February 2018, Scott released a duet version of the song with Grammy nominated singer-songwriter Leona Lewis. Scott remarked in a statement: "Working with Leona was a dream come true. As a fan, I first remember watching her on TV before going on to grace the globe with her incredibly beautiful voice. Now having the honour of working with her on one of my own songs is completely surreal and the passion and raw emotion she brings to our duet makes it even more special to me."

The duet was promoted by Scott and Lewis, with performances on the BBC One's The One Show in the UK and Good Morning America in the US. The duet charted on various Billboard charts in the US, and also charted in New Zealand, Canada and in Europe. The official video for the duet, which features both Scott and Lewis, has since surpassed 400 million views on YouTube and over 100 million streams on Spotify.

In June 2019, "You Are The Reason" (with Leona Lewis) peaked at number 7 on the Billboard Digital Songs Sales chart. The song featured on America's Got Talent during the audition of Kodi Lee. The song also peaked on the Hot Canadian Digital Songs Sales chart, at number 14, following the shows airing.

Other duets

Scott released a version of "You Are the Reason" with Dutch singer Ilse DeLange on 21 May 2018. Additionally, Scott released a French version of "You Are the Reason" with French singer Barbara Pravi on 1 June 2018.  Pravi and Scott sang in both English and French.  The lyrics in the French sections of the song are not faithful translations of the lyrics from the same sections of the English version.  Whereas the English lyrics describe the sensations the singer is experiencing while they ponder the deep significance of someone in their life, the French lyrics describe a turbulent relationship that the singer ponders is worth saving.  For instance, the second part of the first verse in English is:And there goes my mind racing
And you are the reason
That I'm still breathing
I'm hopeless now
The lyrics in the same section of the French version are:
Comme les lueurs fragile
Du soleil à l'automne
Mon coeur se défilent
Défait de toi 
Translated into English: 
Like the faint glow
From the autumn sun
My heart is running away
Get rid of you

Track listing

Credits and personnel
Adapted from Tidal.
 Calum Scott, Corey Sanders, Jon Maguire – composition
 Fraser T Smith – production
 Phil Tan – mixing
 Bill Zimmerman – mixing assistance
 Rob Brinkman – record engineering assistance
 Reuben James – piano
 Kwaku Agyemang, Simone Brown, Rebecca Thomas, Shola Graham, Nathan J Gardner, Keshia Smith, Jayando Cole, Dawn Connie Morton-Young, Isaac Opoku-Kyerematen – ensemble/orchestra
 Shola Graham, Rebecca Thomas, Dawn Connie Morton-Young, Simone Brown, Nathan J Gardner, Jayando Cole, Isaac Opoku-Kyerematen, Keshia Smith, Kwaku Agyemang – choir

Charts

Weekly charts

Year-end charts

Certifications

Release history

See also
 List of number-one songs of 2018 (Malaysia)

References

2017 singles
2018 singles
Capitol Records singles
Calum Scott songs
Leona Lewis songs
Music videos directed by Frank Borin
Music videos shot in Ukraine
Number-one singles in Malaysia
Song recordings produced by Fraser T. Smith
Songs written by Jon Maguire
Male–female vocal duets
Songs written by Calum Scott
Pop ballads
2010s ballads